Thermanaeromonas is a genus of bacteria within the family Thermoanaerobacteraceae. The type species of this genus is Thermanaeromonas toyohensis, a highly thermophilic anaerobe.

See also
 List of bacterial orders
 List of bacteria genera

References

Thermoanaerobacterales
Bacteria genera
Thermophiles
Anaerobes